The 1970 Minnesota lieutenant gubernatorial election took place on November 3, 1970. State Senator Rudy Perpich of the Minnesota Democratic-Farmer-Labor Party defeated Duluth Mayor Ben Boo of the Republican Party of Minnesota. The 1970 lieutenant gubernatorial election was the final lieutenant gubernatorial election held before the Minnesota Constitution was amended to provide for elections of the Governor and Lieutenant Governor on a joint ticket.

Results

External links
 Election Returns

Minnesota
Lieutenant Gubernatorial
1970